Carex gholsonii is a plant species native to Florida, Georgia, Alabama, North Carolina and South Carolina.

Carex gholsonii grows in wet places such as marshes, floodplains, stream banks, etc. It is a monoecious, perennial herb up to 75 cm tall. Leaves are green, up to 30 cm long. Pistillate and staminate flowers are borne in separate spikes on the same plant. Perigynia are ellipsoid, olive to brownish-green, up to 4 mm long with a beak up to 0.5 mm long. Achenes are up to 3 mm long.

References

gholsonii
Plants described in 2002
Flora of the Southeastern United States
Flora without expected TNC conservation status